Miss World 2012, the 62nd edition of the Miss World pageant, was held on 18 August 2012 at Dongsheng Fitness Center Stadium in Ordos, Inner Mongolia, China. 116 contestants from all over the world competed for the crown. Ivian Sarcos of Venezuela crowned her successor Yu Wenxia of China at the end of the event. This is the second time China has won the title of Miss World.

Results

Major Special Awards

Challenge Events 
There were six challenge events. They were Top Model, Beach Fashion, Sport, Multimedia, Talent, and Beauty With a Purpose. Important points were awarded to each winner. All six winners went through to the Top 30.

Top Model 
Atong Demach of South Sudan won Miss World Top Model 2012.

Beach Beauty 
Sophie Moulds of Wales won Miss World Beach Beauty 2012.

Sport 
Sanna Jinnedal of Sweden won Miss World Sport 2012.

Multimedia 
Vanya Mishra of India won Miss World Multimedia 2012.

Talent 
Yu Wenxia of China won Miss World Talent 2012.

Beauty With a Purpose 
Vanya Mishra of India won Miss World Beauty With a Purpose 2012.

Contestants

Notes

Debuts

Returns

Last competed in 2004:
 
Last competed in 2005:
 
Last competed in 2008:
 
Last competed in 2010:

Judges
Miss World 2012 contestants were evaluated by a panel of judges.

 Julia Morley – Chairwoman of the Miss World Organization
 Mike Dixon
 Andrew Minarik – hairstylist for the event
 Stan Reynolds
 Jodie Reynolds
 Chief Mandela 
 Zhang Zilin – Miss World 2007 from China PR
 Jane Wang
 Alfreda Burke
 Shenjian Hong

Venues
The primary site for the competition was Ordos in Inner Mongolia, China. A fashion show was held in Shanghai, and the beachwear competitions were held at the desert resort of Xiangshawan.

Controversy
On 31 January 2013, the official website of Miss World Organisation released a statement regarding the scoreboard errors in the final telecast last 18 August 2012. Miss World was under siege after beauty watchers, fans and even National Directors noticed some inconsistencies in the scoring system. According to the official statement of the Ionoco Ltd., it says that the errors occurred on the graphical scoreboard were solely caused by human error on part of the operator. Miss World Organization provided the Ionoco Ltd. with verified scores, however, the operator failed to update the score table correctly resulting in a discrepancy between the position of the contestants in the scoreboard and the point values displayed.

International broadcasters

 : Star World
 : TPA
 : Direct TV
 : Direct TV
 : Direct TV
 : Armenia TV
 : Direct TV
 : FOXTEL-E!
 : ZNS
 : SRK showtime
 : Direct TV
 : ONT
 : STAR!
 : Channel 5
 : Direct TV
 : Unitel
 : Direct TV
 : RTRS, FTV
 : BTV
 : UOL
 : Direct TV
 : Star World
 : Star World
 : E!
 : Direct TV
 : Canal 13
 : CCTV 2
 : Canal 1
 : TDS
 : Sigma TV
 : STAR! & TNT
 : Direct TV
 : Direct TV
 : Direct TV
 : Dalycartoon
 : Canal 2
 : DRG TV
 : STAR!
 : Fiji Broadcast Corporation
 : STAR!
 : Paris Premiere
 : Telemedia
 : E!
 : GBC
 : Direct TV
 : Paris Premiere
 : Canal 11
 : Direct TV
 : Telesistema
 : Star World
 : STAR!
 : Zee Cafe
 : RCTI
 : Manoto
 : E! Entertainment
 : E!
 : TVJ
 : Star World
 : Royal Media Services Ltd.
 : T Cast
 : Star World
 : STAR!
 : LBCI
 : Lietuvos rytas TV
 : STAR!
 : Star World
 : Sitel
 : Star World
 : Star World
 : Direct TV
 : Paris Premiere
 : MBC
 : Galavision
 : Star World
 : UBS TV
 : STV
 : Star World
 : NBC
 : Star World
 : STAR!
 : Star World
 : Canal 2
 : Silverbird
 : TV2
 : DRG TV
 : STAR!
 Pacific Islands: Star World
 : Star World
 : Telemetro
 : Star World
 : La Tele
 : Direct TV
 : TV5
 : Polsat
 : Sic Internacional
 : Puerto Rico TV
 : Star World
 : Direct TV
 St. Eustasius: Direct TV
 : Direct TV
 : Direct TV
 : Direct TV
 : Direct TV
 : DRG TV
 : SBC
 : MediaCorp Channel 5
 : Star World
 : SABC 3
 : Mediaset Espana
 : Swazi TV
 : STAR!
 : Star World
 : Channel 3
 : CTV
 : CNBC-e
 : Direct TV
 : Direct TV
 : E! Entertainment, Xbox Live (via Xfinity video on demand application)
 : Direct TV
 : Star World
 : Venevisión
 : VTV
 : DRG TV
 : ZNBC
 : ZBC

References

External links
 Pageantopolis – Miss World 2012

Miss World
2012 beauty pageants
2012 in China
Beauty pageants in China
August 2012 events in China